Cyrestis nivea, the straight-line map-wing, is a butterfly of the family Nymphalidae. It is found in South-East Asia. The habitat consists of primary and secondary forest at elevations between sea level and about 500 metres.

Males and females are similar, but females are somewhat paler and have slightly more rounded wings.

The larvae are green and covered with tiny pale tubercules. There is a long curved dark purplish spiky horn on the fifth and eleventh segments.

Subspecies
Cyrestis nivea nivea (Java)
Cyrestis nivea nivalis C. & R. Felder, [1867] (southern Thailand, Peninsular Malaya, Pulau Tioma, Sumatra, Borneo)
Cyrestis nivea pigmentosa Okubo, 1983 
Cyrestis nivea superbus Staudinger (Palawan)
Cyrestis nivea fadorensis Kheil (Nias)
Cyrestis nivea tonkiniana Fruhstorfer, 1901 (northern Indo-China)
Cyrestis nivea baliensis Martin (Bali)
Cyrestis nivea fruhstorferi Röber (Kangean Island)
Cyrestis nivea sumbawana Martin (Sumbawa)

References

Cyrestinae
Butterflies of Borneo
Butterflies of Java
Butterflies described in 1831